This is a list of members of the 'Ndrangheta, a Mafia-type organisation in Calabria, Italy.

A
Carmine Alvaro
Cosimo Alvaro
Domenico Alvaro
Salvatore Aquino
Santo Araniti
Wines Mohamed

B
Carmelo Barbaro
Francesco Barbaro (Castanu)
Giuseppe Barbaro
Giuseppe Bellocco
Gregorio Bellocco
Umberto Bellocco
Michele Bolognino
Carmelo Bruzzese

C
Salvatore Calautti
Antonio Cataldo
Francesco Cataldo
Giuseppe Cataldo
Antonio Cercone
Pasquale Cercone
Guido Cercone
Antonio Coluccio
Giuseppe Coluccio
Salvatore Coluccio
Antonio Commisso
Francesco Commisso
Cosimo Commisso
Giuseppe Commisso
Domenico Condello
Pasquale Condello
Antonio Cordì aka 'U Ragiuneri
Cosimo Cordì
Domenico Cordì
Pietro Criaco

D
Giuseppe D'Agostino
Vincenzo DeMaria
Carmine De Stefano
Giorgio De Stefano
Giorgio De Stefano (1948)
Giuseppe De Stefano
Orazio De Stefano
Paolo De Stefano
Paolo Rosario De Stefano
Emilio Di Giovine

F
Luigi Facchineri
Ernesto Fazzalari
Francesco Fonti

G
Bruno Gioffré
Rocco Gioffrè
Giuseppe Giorgi

I
Giuseppe Iamonte
Natale Iamonte
Vincenzo Iamonte
Antonio Imerti

L
Rocco Lo Presti
Michele Labate
Antonino Latella
Antonio Libri
Domenico Libri

M
Antonio Macrì
Antonio Mammoliti
Saverio Mammoliti
Francesco Mazzaferro
Girolamo Molè
Giuseppe Morabito
Rocco Morabito (born 1960)
Rocco Morabito (born 1966)
Salvatore Morabito

N
Antonio Nirta
Francesco Nirta
Giuseppe Nirta (born 1913)
Giuseppe Nirta (born 1940)

O
Domenico Oppedisano

P
Roberto Pannunzi
Rocco Papalia
Domenico Paviglianiti
Antonio Pelle aka "Ntoni Gambazza" or "La Mamma"
Giuseppe Pelle
Salvatore Pelle
Sebastiano Pelle
Antonino Pesce
Francesco Pesce aka "Cicciu testuni" 
Salvatore Pesce
Vincenzo Pesce
Gioacchino Piromalli
Girolamo Piromalli
Giuseppe Piromalli (born 1921)
Giuseppe Piromalli (born 1945)

R
Antonio Romeo
Sebastiano Romeo
Diego Rosmini
Michele Racco
Domenic Racco
Slick Ricardo

S
Gaetano Santaiti
Maria Serraino
Domenico Serraino
Paolo Serraino
Antonio Strangio
Giovanni Strangio
Sebastiano Strangio

T
Giovanni Tegano
Pasquale Tegano
Robert Trimbole
Domenico Tripodo

U
Luigi Ursino

V
Michele Antonio Varano
Carmine Verduci
Francesco Vottari
Paolo Virgara

Z
Rocco Zito

References

 
Italian criminals
Organized crime members by organization
Ndrangheta
Ndr